Fire on the Mountain is a 1996 documentary about the 10th Mountain Division during World War II. The film follows the division from its training at Camp Hale in Colorado through  its campaign in Italy. The end of the film shows the careers of 10th Mountain Division veterans, who were involved in starting the ski industry in Colorado. The film includes interviews of several of these veterans, including environmentalist David Brower.

External links 
 Fire on the Mountain at the Internet Movie Database

1996 films
Documentary films about World War II
Italian Campaign of World War II films
American documentary films
1996 documentary films
1990s English-language films
1990s American films